Tanghe County is administered by the prefecture-level city of Nanyang, in the southwest of Henan province, People's Republic of China, bordering Hubei province to the south. Its ancient name was Tangzhou.

Tanghe has more than  citizens in those 3 subdistrict offices (include Binhe, Wenfeng and Xingtang), and the county government is located in the Binhe subdistrict office. The urban area expands very quickly, especially westwards, under the background of estate boom across China. The local economy is mainly based on agriculture, including wheat, cotton, pears. The investment and support from the Tanghers who work out of Tanghe is very important to the local economy.

History
 In the Xia dynasty and Shang dynasty, Belonging to Yuzhou from the book “Yugong”.
 In the Zhou dynasty, is the land of Shen, Xie, Tang and Liao Kingdoms.
 In the Qin dynasty, the Huyang County was be set, and belonged to the Nanyang Commandery.
 In the Western Han dynasty, the Eastern Han dynasty and Three Kingdoms, was Huyang County (town), and belongs to the Nanyang region.
 In the Jin dynasty (266–420), was the land of Jiyang county, and belongs to Yiyang region.
 In the Northern and Southern Dynasties, the Northern Wei Kingdom set Zhongli, Xiangcheng, Chenyang, Shima Morogata, respectively belongs to south Xiangzhou, west Huai'an region and Xiangcheng region. The urban district in Tanghe now was the county government at that time, then was the state government and the county government later, respectively.
 In the Sui dynasty, there are two Counties named Shangma and Huyang in the territory, and belongs to the Chongling Region.
 In the Tang dynasty
In the first year of Zhenguan (672 A.D.) of Tang Emperor Taizong, the Shangma County was be incorporated to the Huyang County, and the Huzhou state was abolished and be changed to Tangzhou (the State government in Zaoyang now). 
In the 9th year of Tang Emperor Taizong, the State government was moved to Biyang (the Biyang now). 
In the 13th year of Kaiyuan (725 A.D.) of Tang Emperor Xuanzong, re-established the Shangma County divided from Huyang County, and all belong to the Tangzhou State. 
In the 1st year of Tianbao (742 A. D.) of Tang Emperor Xuanzong, the Shangma County was renamed Biyang County (the County government is near the urban district of Tanghe County now), and belongs to Tangzhou State.
In the 3rd year of Tianyou (906 A.D.) of Tang Emperor Aidi, the state government was moved from Biyang to Biyang (now the urban district of Tanghe County), and Tangzhou State was renamed to Bizhou State.

 In the Five Dynasties and Ten Kingdoms, was named the Biyang County, then belongs to Bizhou State, Tangzhou State and Bizhou State in the Later Liang Kingdom, Later Tang Kingdom and Later Jin Kingdom, respectively. Then belongs to Tangzhou State in the Later Han and Later Zhou Kingdom.
 In the Song dynasty and Jin dynasty (1115–1234), was Biyang County and Huyang County, all belongs to Tangzhou State.
 In the South Song dynasty
In the 11th year of Shaoxing (1141 A.D.) of Song Emperor Gaozong, was belongs to Jin Kingdom, and return to South Song in the 31st year of Shaoxing. 
In the 2nd year of Longxing (1164 A. D.) of South Song Emperor Xiaozong, was belongs to Jin Kingdom. In the alternately of South Song and Jin, the attribute had no changed. 
In the 6th year of Jiading of South Song Emperor Ningzong, also the 1st year of Zhining of Jin Emperor Weishao (1213 A.D.), the Huyang County was abolished and incorporated to Biyang County (now Tanghe) as Huyang Town, and belongs to Tangzhou State.
In the 1st year of Duanping (1234 A.D.) of South Song Emperor Lizong, the Jin Kingdom was eliminated by the union of Mongol Kingdom and Song Kingdom, the Biyang County (now Tanghe) returned to South Song and belongs to Tangzhou State.

 In the Yuan dynasty
In the 2nd year of Zhiyuan (1265 A.D.) of Yuan Emperor Shizu Kublai Khan, the Huyang County was re-established separate from the Biyang County (now Tanghe) and belongs to Tangzhou State. At this time, the Tangzhou State administered Biyang (now tanghe), Huyang, Biyang (now Biyang) and Tongbai this four Counties.
In the 3rd year of Zhiyuan (1266 A.D.), the Huyang, Biyang and Tongbai Counties were abolished and set Huyang, Biyang and Tongbai Town, respectively, and incorporated to Tangzhou State. Then the Biyang (now tanghe) was incorporated to Tangzhou State too. At this time, the Tangzhou State had no County to administrate at all, and belongs to the Jiangbei Road of Henan. In the 8th year (1271 A.D.), belongs to Nanyang Fu.

 In the Ming dynasty
In the 2nd year of Hongwu (1369 A.D.), the Tangzhou State was abolished and set Tang County (govern the urban district of now Tanghe), belongs to Nanyang Fu. In the 14th year (1381 A.D.), the Biyang Town was separated from Tang County and set Biyang County (govern the now Biyang County). In the 12th year of Chenghua (1476 A.D.), the Tongbai Town was separated and set Tongbai County (govern the now Tongbai County).

 In the Qing dynasty
Inheritance and followed the system of Ming dynasty.

 In the Republic of China
In the beginning year was Tang County, belongs to Nanyang Fu. In the 2nd year of ROC (1913 A.D.), renamed the Biyuan County, belongs to Yunan (South Henan) Road. In the 3rd year, changed and belongs to Ruyang Road. In the 12th year, renamed Tanghe County, belong to Ruyang Road. In the 16th year, the Ruyang Road was abolished, the County belongs to Henan Province. In the 21st year, changed and belongs to the Sixth District Chief Inspector of Henan Province.

In November of the 37th year, the county was captured by the PLA. In December 28, the Tanghe County (also named Tangbei County, government located in the now urban district ), Tangnan County (dominate the south of Sanjiahe River, government located in the now Qiyi Town) were established. In the August of next year, the Tangxi County (government located in the now Zhangdian Town). In 1947 – 1948, the Tanghe (or Tangbei), Tangnan and Tangxi Counties in the territory, and all belongs to the First Patriotic Democratic Chief Inspector of Tongbai Region. In the winter of 37th year of ROC, the Tanghe (Tangbei) County was changed and belongs to the Second Patriotic Democratic Chief Inspector of Tongbai Region. In March of the 38th year, the Tanghe (Tangbei), Tangnan and Tangxi County merge into Tanghe County, the county government located in now Tanghe County, belongs to Nanyang Region.

 In the People's Republic of China
Named Tanghe County, still belongs to Nanyang Region.

Administrative divisions
As 2012, this county is divided to 2 subdistricts, 12 towns and 7 townships.
Subdistricts
Binhe Subdistrict
Wenfeng Subdistrict | 文峰街道)

Towns

Townships

Climate

Transport 
 Tanghe Railway Station Nanjing–Xi'an Railway goes through the southern suburb of Tanghe.
 G40 Shanghai–Xi'an Expressway goes through the northern suburb of the town.
 China National Highway [G312], [G328] and [G234] go through the county.
 Henan Provincial Road [S233], [S332], [S334] and [S530] go through the towns.
 Nanyang Jiangying Airport is about 40 km away from Tanghe city.
 Tanghe River Shipping has been included in the national twelfth Five-Year Development Plan.

Public transportation 
Connections between Tanghe city and all its towns are provided by buses.

Notable residents 
 Feng Youlan (1895.12.04 — 1990.11.26), Philosopher. Graduate from Peking University in 1918. A History of Chinese Philosophy (1934, in two volumes), A Short History of Chinese Philosophy(1948), A New History of Chinese Philosophy, Six Books in Zhen and Yuan as his representatives.
 Feng Jinglan (1898.3.9 — 1976.9.29), geologist. Graduate from Colorado School of Mines in 1921. A professor of Beijing Institute of Geology (The original name of the China University of Geosciences).
 Feng Yuanjun (1900 — 1974), female, a famous writer. 
 Li Ji (1922.8.16 — 1980), poet.
 Zhang Xingjiang (1907 — 1936), revolutionary martyrs.
 Zhang Fengyi (1956.9.1 —  ), a famous actor.

References

External links
 

County-level divisions of Henan
Nanyang, Henan